Powerhouse is an American television series produced by the Educational Film Center at Northern Virginia ETV, which aired on PBS for 16 episodes in 1982. It was billed as "a 16-part series for young people and their families," with the target audience being primarily children, preteens, teenagers, and young adults. The series was later rerun by Nickelodeon from 1984 to 1986.

Premise
Set in Washington, D.C., Powerhouse is focused on the adventures of a racially and ethnically diverse group of five teenagers and one adult from the inner city, based at a former boxing and sports gym headquarters turned into a youth community center. The center was founded by Brenda Gaines, a woman who inherited the property from her late father, a former boxing champion. The basic message of the series is that every person is a source of creativity and power, expressed in the lyrics of the show's theme song as "We all have a Powerhouse deep down inside".

Each episode deals with significant personal issues affecting young people, such as alcoholism, peer pressure, and physical fitness, combined with fast-paced action-adventure stories in which the group often has to solve a mystery or prevent a crime. For example, in one episode they have to expose the head of a racketeering operation that threatens to put Brenda and Powerhouse out of business. In another episode, they try to locate the source of a potentially lethal food-poisoning outbreak.

Episodes were presented in two acts, with a break in between; the breaks were filled by "uncommercials", short clips designed to convey ideas potentially of interest to the series' target audience (such as health, fitness and cultural diversity). Another Powerhouse feature was a salute to a particular youth organization, such as the Boy Scouts of America, which preceded at least one of the uncommercials.

Characters
Brenda Gaines (Sandra Bowie) — Brenda is the founder of Powerhouse, which was originally her father's gymnasium. She turns it into an after-school youth center, which the five teenagers eventually join. Brenda is the leader as well the mother of the Powerhouse gang and the de facto authority figure, although she treats the five teens as equals.
Jennifer LaBianca (Domenica Galati) — Jennifer is a friendly teenager and owner of the Powerhouse van, who has a strong aptitude for mechanics.
Kevin Jackson (Michael Mack) — 18-year-old Kevin is the eldest of the five teenagers. He is the rock of the Powerhouse gang, who acts as a big brother to the younger characters.
Lolo Knopke (Jason Kravits) — Aged 13, Lolo is insecure about his appearance because he is very short and has to wear glasses, giving him the appearance of a stereotypical nerd, but he is also one of the smartest members of the group.
Pepper McKenzie (Jessica Prentice) — 12-year-old Pepper is one of the most outgoing members of the group, despite being the youngest. She is impulsive and adventurous, and is prone to finding herself in trouble.
Tony Dominguez (Michael Wikes) — Tony is a streetwise 17-year-old. He is a good person at heart but sometimes feels like he has to play the tough guy to mask his insecurities.

Episode list
 "With a Little Help From My Friends (Part 1)": Brenda Gaines inherits her late father's gym, Powerhouse, intending to convert it into a youth center. She receives help from Jennifer LaBianca, Kevin Jackson, Tony Dominguez, Lolo Knopke, and Pepper McKenzie, but their efforts are threatened by a gang led by the mysterious Castor.
 "With a Little Help From My Friends (Part 2)": Having been framed for a crime she didn't commit, Brenda tries to learn Castor's identity and successfully open Powerhouse.
 "Life or Breath": The son of a foreign ambassador is kidnapped, and the Powerhouse gang urgently attempts to find and rescue him, as he needs medicine for a stress-related illness.
 "Master of the Art": When an artifact is delivered to the local museum, the Powerhouse gang and the curator attempt to prove that there are flaws with the museum's alarm system.
 "You Make Me Sick": When people all over town contract a fatal virus, the gang sets out to find the cause. Their task becomes more urgent when Brenda herself catches the virus after taking a bite of a tainted tuna fish sandwich.
 "Celebration": Lolo decides to call off his Bar Mitzvah after he and his grandfather become victims of a hate crime.
 "Something for Nothing": Brenda temporarily closes Powerhouse following an accident that hurts Lolo. While she goes to New York to get money for repairs, the kids decide to film a commercial about Powerhouse, unaware they are being scammed by a crooked landowner and his accomplice.
 "Cheers": Pepper and Lt. Al Gambrino's son Peter learn the hard way about the dangers of drinking excessively.
 "Name of the Game": Both Tony's foot injury and the antagonistic behavior of new team player El Gato threaten Powerhouse's chances of winning the championship soccer game.
 "One of the Gang": Kevin refuses help from Mike, a boy with a prosthetic arm. Meanwhile, at a nursing home, elderly resident Diamonds O'Toole is targeted by a thief posing as an orderly, who tries to torture him into revealing the location of diamonds he hid somewhere in Powerhouse.
 "Something Ventured" (the pilot episode): The Powerhouse gang and Brenda attempt to identify the perpetrator of a series of burglaries. In this episode, Kevin is Brenda's son, and Bobby and Bizzy are later renamed Tony and Pepper. Also, both the gang and Powerhouse are already established.
 "Help Wanted": Tammy DeWitt arrives with her baby son David, and the Powerhouse gang try to work out whether she kidnapped him.
 "What Have You Got to Lose?": Kevin and his boss Mr. Baxter agree to try a doctor's weight loss program.
 "Big Devil": Angie tries to prove herself as a female jockey by riding Big Devil.
 "Fit to be Tied": When a visitor's brother is kidnapped by people who want a microfilm, the Powerhouse gang try to rescue him.
 "The Short Life of Lolo Knopke": A bomb goes off at Powerhouse, killing Lolo. Brenda, Jennifer, and Kevin recount all the times he helped solve crimes and problems. But nothing is what it appears to be.

References

External links
Educational Film Center (rights holder)
 

PBS original programming
1982 American television series debuts
1983 American television series endings
1980s American children's television series
American children's education television series
English-language television shows
Health education television series
Television series about teenagers
Television shows set in Washington, D.C.
PBS Kids shows